Mark Aubrey Tennyson, 5th Baron Tennyson  (28 March 1920 – 3 July 2006) was a British peer. He was the second son of Lionel Tennyson, 3rd Baron Tennyson and the Hon. Clarissa Madeline Georgiana Felicite Tennant. The great-grandson of poet Alfred, Lord Tennyson, he succeeded his brother as 5th Baron Tennyson in 1991.

Tennyson served in the Royal Navy from 1937 to 1960, rising to the rank of commander, and saw action during World War II. He was Mentioned in Despatches in 1945 in recognition of his military service during the war. He was subsequently an executive of Rowntree Mackintosh and Joseph Terry & Sons. In 1964, he married Deline Celeste Budler (d. 1995). The two had no children.

References

External links
 
 

1920 births
2006 deaths
Barons Tennyson
Royal Navy officers of World War II
Recipients of the Distinguished Service Cross (United Kingdom)
Mark
Younger sons of barons

Tennyson